The Hon. Barton Wallop (5 November 1744 – 1 September 1781) was Master of Magdalene College, Cambridge from 1774 until 1781.

The third son of John Wallop, Viscount Lymington, he was educated at Eton and Magdalene. He held livings in Portsmouth and Cliddesden.

In 1771, he married Camilla Powlett Smith with whom he had two children.

References 

18th-century English Anglican priests
Alumni of Trinity College, Cambridge
Masters of Magdalene College, Cambridge
1744 births
1781 deaths
People educated at Eton College